Abegesta is a genus of moths of the family Crambidae. The genus was erected by Eugene G. Munroe in 1964.

Species
 Abegesta concha Munroe, 1964
 Abegesta reluctalis  (Hulst, 1886)
 Abegesta remellalis (Druce, 1899) – white-trimmed abegesta

References

Notes

Glaphyriinae
Crambidae genera
Taxa named by Eugene G. Munroe